Horst Werner Buchholz (4 December 1933 – 3 March 2003) was a German actor who appeared in more than 60 feature films from 1951 to 2002. During his youth, he was sometimes called "the German James Dean". He is perhaps best known in English-speaking countries for his role as Chico in The Magnificent Seven (1960), as a communist in Billy Wilder's One, Two, Three (1961), and as Dr. Lessing in Life Is Beautiful (1997).

Early life 
Horst Buchholz was born in Berlin, the son of Maria Hasenkamp. He never knew his biological father, but took the surname of his stepfather Hugo Buchholz, a shoemaker, whom his mother married in 1938. His half-sister Heidi, born in 1941, gave him the nickname Hotte, which he kept for the rest of his life.

During World War II, he was evacuated to Silesia, and at the end of the war, he found himself in a foster home in Czechoslovakia. He returned to Berlin as soon as he could.

Buchholz barely finished his schooling before seeking theater work, first appearing on stage in 1949. He soon left his childhood home in East Berlin to work in West Berlin. He established himself in the theater, notably the Schiller Theater, and on radio.

Early film career 
Buchholz expanded into film work by doing foreign-language voice dubbing, for example Lampwick in Pinocchio and Ben Cooper in Johnny Guitar.

In 1951 he started getting small, uncredited on-screen parts in films like Warum? (1951) and Adventure in Berlin (1952).

He had a larger role in Marianne of My Youth (1954), directed by Julien Duvivier and was in a TV movie Die Schule der Väter. He was in Sky Without Stars (1955) from Helmut Käutner and Regine (1956).

Stardom 

His youthful good looks next brought him a part in Die Halbstarken (1956), which made him a teen favorite in Germany; an English-dubbed version was released in the US as Teenage Wolfpack, with Buchholz billed as Henry Bookholt and promoted as a new James Dean.

He was in King in Shadow (1957) then The Girl and the Legend (1957) with Romy Schneider. Full-fledged stardom resulted from Confessions of Felix Krull (1957), in which he played the lead of a narcissistic high-class conman; it was directed by Kurt Hoffmann and based on the novel by Thomas Mann. He made another with Schneider, Monpti (1957), aka Love from Paris.

That year he starred in Two Worlds (1958), Wet Asphalt (1958), and Auferstehung (1958) aka Resurrection.

English-language films 

Buchholz began appearing in English-language films in 1959, when he co-starred in the British production Tiger Bay with Hayley Mills. It was a notable success.  In her autobiography, Mills revealed she had a schoolgirl crush on Buchholz during the filming of Tiger Bay and was saddened when the cast threw him an engagement party.

He returned to Germany for Ship of the Dead (1959), then accepted an offer from Hollywood to play a young aspiring gunslinger in The Magnificent Seven (1960), a remake of Akira Kurosawa's Seven Samurai (1954) in which he would play the role originally portrayed by Toshiro Mifune in the Japanese version. Arriving in the U.S. with time to spare before filming began, Buchholz lingered in New York and appeared on Broadway in a short-lived adaptation of Cheri (1959) and then continued westward.

After The Magnificent Seven, which went on to become a classic, Buchholz played in the romantic drama Fanny (1961) with Leslie Caron and Maurice Chevalier, and the Berlin-set comedy One, Two, Three (1961), directed by Billy Wilder and starring James Cagney. Though filmed in Mexico, France and Germany respectively, these were Hollywood productions and Buchholz had begun a period of residence in Los Angeles. He proved to be popular with American audiences, but several missed opportunities thwarted the upward trajectory of his career and it began to stall. Filming schedule conflicts prevented him from accepting the offered roles of Tony in West Side Story (1961) and Sherif Ali in Lawrence of Arabia (1962), a part that eventually went to Omar Sharif.

Instead he played the lead in Nine Hours to Rama (1963) for Twentieth Century Fox and The Empty Canvas (1963), shot in Italy with Bette Davis. He returned to Broadway to appear in Andorra (1963), which had a short run.

International star 
On the advice of his agent, like many other actors who were asked, he turned down the starring role in A Fistful of Dollars (1964). He was in Marco the Magnificent (1965) with Anthony Quinn; That Man in Istanbul (1965), a Eurosopy film; Johnny Banco (1967), a comedy with Yves Allégret; and Young Rebel (1967), a biopic of Miguel de Cervantes with Gina Lollobrigida. He guest starred on The Danny Thomas Hour (1968).

Buchholz starred in Astragal (1969), How, When and with Whom (1969), The Dove Must Not Fly (1970), and The Saviour (1971). He returned to Hollywood lead roles briefly with The Great Waltz (1971) playing Johann Strauss.

Buchholz starred in ...But Johnny! (1973), and The Catamount Killing (1974). He appeared on German television in shows like Die Klempner kommen (1976).

Supporting actor 
Buchholz moved to supporting roles in films like The Savage Bees (1976), Raid on Entebbe (1976), Dead of Night (1977), and The Amazing Captain Nemo (1978). He guest starred on episodes of Logan's Run, Fantasy Island, Charlie's Angels, and How the West Was Won and had the lead in Women in Hospital (1977) and a role in The French Atlantic Affair  (1979).

Buchholz was in From Hell to Victory (1979), and Avalanche Express (1979). He had the co lead in Berlin Tunnel 21 (1981) and was top billed in Aphrodite (1981). He guest starred on Derrick and had a supporting part in Sahara (1983).

Later career 
He went to Hollywood for parts in Code Name: Emerald (1985) and Crossings (1986).

Buchholz's credits include Affari di famiglia (1986), Die Fräulein von damals (1986), and Der Schatz im Niemandsland (1987). He had the lead in And the Violins Stopped Playing (1989) and supporting role in Escape from Paradise (1990).

Buchholz turned up in Aces: Iron Eagle III (1992), Touch and Die  (1992), Faraway, So Close! (1993), The Cave of the Golden Rose 4 (1995), Tödliches Erbe (1995), Der Clan der Anna Voss (1995), Maître Da Costa, and The Firebird (1997). He portrayed Dr. Lessing in Roberto Benigni's Life Is Beautiful (1997).

He was in Geisterstunde – Fahrstuhl ins Jenseits (1997), Der kleine Unterschied (1997), Dunckel (1998) and Der kleine Unterschied (1998), and voiced Fa Zhou in the German dub of Mulan. He returned to America for Voyage of Terror (1998).

Buchholz's last performances include Kinderraub in Rio – Eine Mutter schlägt zurück (1998), Heller als der Mond (2000), The Enemy (2001), Der Club der grünen Witwen (2001), Traumfrau mit Verspätung (2001),  (2001), Abschnitt 40 (2001), Atlantic Affairs (2002) and In der Mitte eines Lebens (2003).

Personal life and death 
In 1958, Buchholz married French actress Myriam Bru and they had two children: Christopher, an actor, and daughter Beatrice.

Buchholz explained in a 2000 interview that he and Myriam had a stable and enduring arrangement, with her life centered in Paris and his in Berlin, the city that he loved. Their son Christopher Buchholz, also an actor, produced a feature-length documentary Horst Buchholz ... Mein Papa (2005).

Buchholz died unexpectedly at the age of 69 on March 3, 2003 at Charité from pneumonia that developed after an operation for a hip fracture. Berlin was the city to which his loyalty was consistent, and he was buried there in the Friedhof Heerstraße.

Selected filmography 

 All Clues Lead to Berlin (1952), as Young Man at the Radio Tower (uncredited)
 Marianne of My Youth (1955), as Vincent Loringer (German version only)
 Sky Without Stars (1955), as Mischa Bjelkin
 Regine (1956), as Karl Winter
 Teenage Wolfpack (1956), as Freddy Borchert
 King in Shadow (1957), as King Christian
 The Girl and the Legend (1957), as Tom
 Confessions of Felix Krull (1957), as Felix Krull
 Love From Paris (1957), as Monpti (as a young man)
 A Piece of Heaven (1957), as Cabriolet-Driver (uncredited)
  (1958), as Mecky Berger
 Nasser Asphalt (1958), as Greg Bachmann
 Resurrection (1958), as Nechljudoff
 Tiger Bay (1959), as Korchinsky
 The Death Ship (1959), as Philip Gale
 The Magnificent Seven (1960), as Chico
 Fanny (1961), as Marius
 One, Two, Three (1961), as Otto Ludwig Piffl
 Nine Hours to Rama (1963), as Nathuram Godse
 The Empty Canvas (1963), as Dino
 Marco the Magnificent (1965), as Marco Polo
 That Man in Istanbul (1965), as Tony Mecenas
 Johnny Banco (1967), as Johnny Banco
 Cervantes (1967, in the title role), as Miguel De Cervantes
 L'Astragale (1968), as Julien
 Come, quando, perché (1969), as Alberto
  (1970), as Pablo Vallajo
 Le Sauveur (1971), as Claude
 The Great Waltz (1972), as Johann Strauss Jr.
  (1973), as Jonny
 Welcome Stranger (1973)
  (1974), as Mark Kalvin
 Derrick
Season 3, Episode 11: "Das Superding" (1976), as Gerke
Season 5, Episode 8: "Solo für Margarete" (1978), as Alexis
Season 7, Episode 8: "Auf einem Gutshof" (1980), as Richard Schulte
Season 10, Episode 2: "Die Tote in der Isar" (1983), as Arthur Dissmann
 Raid on Entebbe (1976, TV Movie), as Wilfried Böse
 Dead of Night (1977, TV Movie), as Michael
 Women in Hospital (1977), as Dr. Schumann
 Logan's Run Season 1, Episode 3: "Capture" (1977), as James Borden
 The Return of Captain Nemo (1978), as King Tibor
 Charlie's Angels Season 3, Episode 3: Angel Come Home (1978), as Paul Ferrino
 The French Atlantic Affair (1979), as Dr. Chabot
 From Hell to Victory (1979), as Jürgen Dietrich
 Avalanche Express (1979), as Julian Scholten
 Berlin Tunnel 21 (1981), as Emerich Weber
 Aphrodite (1982), as Harry Laird
 Sahara (1983), as Von Glessing
  (1984), as Robert Feldmann
 Code Name: Emerald (1985), as Walter Hoffman
 And the Violins Stopped Playing (1988), as Dymitr Mirga
 Réquiem por Granada (1990), as Muley Hacén 
 Aces: Iron Eagle III (1992), as Ernst Leichmann
 Faraway, So Close! (1993), as Tony Baker
 Fantaghirò 4 (1994), as Darken
 Ptak ohnivak (1997), as King Jorgen
 Life Is Beautiful (1997), as Dottor Lessing
 Mulan (1998) (German Dub)
 Heller als der Mond (2000), as First Guest
 The Enemy (2001), as Dr. George Ashton
  (2002), as Professor Svedenborg

Dubbing roles 
Lampwick – Pinocchio (1940 film) (1951 dub)

References

External links 

 
 
Horst Buchholz at the German Dubbing Card Index

1933 births
2003 deaths
Bisexual male actors
Burials in Germany
Deaths from pneumonia in Germany
German Film Award winners
German male film actors
German male voice actors
German LGBT actors
German bisexual people
Male actors from Berlin
20th-century German male actors
21st-century German male actors
20th-century German LGBT people